The Tyrrell 018 was a Formula One racing car designed by Harvey Postlethwaite and Jean-Claude Migeot. It was built and raced by Tyrrell Racing. It used a customer Ford DFR engine.

History

1989 
The 018 made its debut at the second race of the 1989 Formula One season, the San Marino Grand Prix. Michele Alboreto was given the car for qualifying, but had problems with the fuel pump and failed to qualify. Jonathan Palmer qualified the team's old 017B but raced the newer 018 instead, which he drove into the points with a sixth place. Two races later at the Mexican Grand Prix Alboreto took a third place behind reigning world champion Ayrton Senna and fellow Italian F1 veteran Riccardo Patrese.

It was generally believed in the F1 paddock at the time that the 018 with its sleek aerodynamics was one of the fastest of the new 3.5L cars in a straight line, despite running the underpowered customer DFR engine.

1990 
The 018 was replaced after two races of the 1990 Formula One season by the first of the "high-nose" cars in Formula One, the Tyrrell 019.

The 018 was the first Tyrrell to lead a Grand Prix since Alboreto won the 1983 Detroit Grand Prix when Alesi jumped from fourth to first at the start of the 1990 United States Grand Prix and led the first 34 laps of the race before being passed by the McLaren-Honda of Ayrton Senna.

Complete Formula One results
(key) (results in italics indicate fastest lap)

* 9 points scored in  using Tyrrell 019.

Notes

Tyrrell Formula One cars